Tuca & Bertie is an American animated television series created by cartoonist Lisa Hanawalt. The show is an animated slice-of-life comedy featuring two anthropmorphic bird characters: Tuca Toucan (a toco toucan, voiced by Tiffany Haddish) and Roberta "Bertie" Songthrush (a song thrush, voiced by Ali Wong).

The show was first announced for first-run distribution on Netflix in 2019. The distributor canceled the show after its first season of ten episodes. Due to fan backlash, the program was picked up for a second season by Adult Swim, a programming block of Cartoon Network. The show's second season, also composed of ten episodes, aired between June and August 2021. On November 2, 2022, Hanawalt announced the series was cancelled again after two seasons.

During the course of the series, 30 episodes of Tuca and Bertie aired over three seasons

Series overview

Episodes

Season 1 (2019)

Season 2 (2021)

Season 3 (2022)

References

 
Lists of American adult animated television series episodes
Lists of American sitcom episodes